Renown Pictures Corporation is a British film distributor founded by producer George Minter in 1938.

Releases
Renown's releases include:
 Scrooge (1951)
 Grand National Night (1953)
 Dance, Little Lady (1954)
 Svengali (1954)
 It's a Wonderful World (1956)
 Tread Softly Stranger (1958)
 Beat Girl (1959)
 Beyond This Place (1959)

See also 
 Talking Pictures TV

References

External links
 

Mass media companies established in 1938
Film distributors of the United Kingdom